Vera Pagava (February 27, 1907 – March 25, 1988; in Georgian ვერა ფაღავა) was a Georgian artist based in Paris.

Early life
Vera Pagava was born in Tbilisi, Georgia. Her father was a lawyer; her mother was an educator. She moved to Berlin, Germany with her family in 1920, just months before Georgia became part of the Soviet Union. In 1923, they join the Georgian community in exile in France and settle in Montrouge. Vera Pagava studied decorative arts and painting first at the Arts et Publicité School, at the Ecole Nationale Supérieure des Arts Décoratifs, then at André Lhote Studio. From 1932 to 1939, she studied under Roger Bissière in the Academie Ranson. There, she met artists who would become her most faithful friends, such as Nicolas Wacker, Jean Bertholle, Maria Helena Vieira Da Silva, Arpad Szenes, Etienne Martin, Roger Hilton, Jean Le Moal, Guidette Carbonell, François Stahly.

Career
In 1938 and 1939, Pagava participated to the Témoignage group show, initiated by Marcel Michaud. She presented painted fabrics. In 1943, Pagava met the famous  gallery owner Jeanne Bucher, who exhibited her paintings alongside Dora Maar's in 1944. Several exhibitions at the Jeanne Bucher gallery will follow, in 1947, 1951, 1954 and 1960.

In the 1950s, Pagava's works are largely presented abroad, in Pittsburgh in 1952 (Pittsburgh International Exhibition of Contemporary Art.), in Brussels in 1953, Norway in 1954 (Oslo, Bergen Trondheim, with Janice Biala and Maria Helena Vieira da Silva), Wuppertal in 1955, Berlin in 1956, Lausanne in 1957, New York at the Meltzer Gallery in 1959.

She created a monumental mural work for the Vatican City pavilion at the Brussels World's Fair in 1958.

In 1966, she represented France at the 33rd Venice Biennale. A room was dedicated to her watercolors.

A large retrospective of her work is organized in 1968 at the Chateau de Ratilly, in Yonne, France.

From 1972, Vera Pagava became the leading artist of the galerie Darial (rue de Beaune, Paris), founded by art dealer and close friend Thamar Tarassachvili.

In 1979, her life-time companion, artist "Vano" Ivane Enoukidze, died.

In 1982 and 1983, a retrospective exhibition is organized in different french museums : Musée des beaux-arts de Dijon (Donation Granville), Musée de Beauvais,  Musée Saint-Denis de Reims and Musée des Beaux-Arts de Troyes.

The first retrospective of her work in Georgia was held in 2012 at the Dmitri Schevardnadze National Gallery.

Her work moved from figurative to abstract between the 1930s and the 1960s; she often used geometric forms and warm pale tones and greys in her work. "Vera Pagava susurre, ou presque" (Vera Pagava whispers, or almost), commented a critic in 2016. Another critic described her later work as "highly singular, combining formal purity with luminous intimacy."

Personal life and legacy
Vera Pagava died in 1988, at Ivry-sur-Seine, aged 81 years. She is buried in Leuville-sur-Orge Cemetery. The "Association culturelle Vera Pagava" was founded in Paris in 1991 to promote and preserve Vera Pagava's work and archives. Her work is part of various private and public collections such as the Pompidou Centre.

In 2022, Pagava's work was included in The Guggenheim Museum Bilbao's exhibit: "From Fauvism to Surrealism: Masterpieces from the Musée d’Art Moderne (MAM) de Paris."

Museums 

 Musée National d’Art Moderne (MNAM) Centre Georges Pompidou, Paris, France
 Musée d'art moderne de la ville de Paris, Paris, France
 Fonds Régional d’Art Contemporain (FRAC) d’Ile-de-France, France
 Centre National d'Art Contemporain (CNAC), France
 Musée des Beaux-arts de Dijon (Donation Pierre Granville), Dijon, France
 Unterlinden Museum, Colmar, France
 Gajac Museum, Villeneuve-sur-Lot, France
 Museum of Grenoble, Grenoble, France
 Pierre Noel Museum, Saint-Dié des Vosges, France
Musée d'art moderne et contemporain de Saint-Etienne, MAMC+, France
Musée cantonal des Beaux-arts de Lausanne, Switzerland
 Georgian National Museum, Tbilisi, Georgia

References

1907 births
1988 deaths
Artists from Tbilisi
Georgian emigrants to France
Modern artists
School of Paris
French abstract artists